Port of Saints is a live album of performed by multi-instrumentalist Joe McPhee recorded in 2000 in France and first released on the CjR label.

Reception

On All About Jazz, Lyn Horton wrote "Port of Saints describes an epic journey whose main character is the saxophone. A guitar acts as the saxophone's alter ego. Two basses supply avuncular guide posts for traveling to an unknowable but certain destination. The journey is rife both with fantasy and human spirit".

Track listing 
All compositions by Joe McPhee, Raymond Boni, Michael Bisio and Dominic Duval.
 "Port of Saints" – 51:00
 "The Snake, the Fish (and Things)" – 13:52

Personnel 
Joe McPhee – tenor saxophone
Raymond Boni – electric guitar
Michael Bisio, Dominic Duval – bass

References 

 
Joe McPhee live albums
2006 live albums